Brian Ernest Austin Brown OAM (29 December 193328 January 2013) was an Australian jazz musician and educator. He played the soprano and tenor saxophones, flutes, synthesisers (including the WX5 wind synthesiser), panpipes and a leather bowhorn (designed by Garry Greenwood). In 1993 Brown was awarded the Order of Australia for service to the performing arts as a jazz performer, educator and composer.

Biography

Brian Brown was born in Melbourne. He performed as a soloist and led his own ensembles since the mid-1950s throughout Australia and in Scandinavia, United States, Japan, United Kingdom, Italy, Spain, the Netherlands, Brunei and Germany. He played only original music. A self-taught player who emerged in the 1950s as a leading figure in Australia and remained prominent through to the 1980s. According to AllMusic's Ron Wynn, "Brown was one of first Australian musicians to develop a reputation for highly personal, individualistic style that was intense, lyrical and not simple imitation of an American great."

In early 1956 Brown returned to Melbourne from Europe and formed a new Hard Bop band with like-minded players – drummer Stewie Speer, trumpeter Keith Hounslow, schoolboy pianist Dave Martin and bassist Barry Buckley. The Brian Brown Quintet were regulars at Horst Liepolt's influential Jazz Centre 44 in St Kilda, which operated from 1955 to 1960. The band were enthusiastic ambassadors for bop, introducing Melburnians to a musical style which was still largely unheard in Australia.

Brown made eight albums over an 18-year period heading various groups. He toured Europe with his Australian Jazz Ensemble in 1978, and also led groups doing experimental and original classical pieces from 1980 to 1986. He founded the Improvisation Studies course at the Victorian College of the Arts, where he taught from 1978 until his retirement in 1998. He appeared at the World Saxophone Congress in Tokyo in 1988, with Tony Gould. In June 1993 Brown was awarded the Order of Australia for service to the performing arts as a jazz performer, educator and composer.

Discography

 1972 Brian Brown Quintet 1958
 1976 Moomba Jazz '76 Vol. 2 (live LP Galapagos Duck/Brian Brown Quintet)
 1977 Upward
 1978 Brian Brown Quartet in Concert
 1979 Bells Make me Sing
 1972 Carlton Streets
 1984 Wildflowers
 1985 The Planets
 1987 Winged Messenger
 1990 Spirit of the Rainbow - Brian Brown and Tony Gould (Move records)
 1997 Flight
 1998 Last day on Earth
 2001 Jupiter Moon
 2003 Images
 2004 Time will tell
 2004 Circles
 2004 Midnight
 2005 Last Dance
 2005 Inner Spirit
 2005 Inner Light
 2006 Mystic Sky
 2006 Long Ago
 2006 Another Time
 2006 Texture of Light
 2007 Seasons
 2007 Magic
 2007 Cosmic Light
 2007 Contact
 2007 Venus Moon
 2007 Bells in the Night

References

External links

 

1933 births
2013 deaths
Australian jazz saxophonists
Male saxophonists
20th-century Australian musicians
20th-century saxophonists
20th-century Australian male musicians
Male jazz musicians